Andrew Clark (7 October 1879 – 10 August 1940) was a Scottish professional footballer who played as a left back in the Football League for Leeds City and Stoke.

Career
Clark was born in Ballingry and played for Hamilton Academical, Buckhaven United and Heart of Midlothian, before joining English club Stoke in 1901. He spent two seasons at Stoke, making 37 appearances in 1901–02 and 22 in 1902–03, before returning to Scotland to join East Fife. He re-entered English football with Southern League club Plymouth Argyle in 1903, for whom he made 143 appearances in three seasons. He then spent the 1906–07, 1907–08 and 1908–09 seasons with Leeds City, Brentford and Southend United respectively.

Career statistics

References

External links
 Andy Clark at greensonscreen.co.uk

1879 births
People from Ballingry
Scottish footballers
Association football defenders
Hamilton Academical F.C. players
Heart of Midlothian F.C. players
Stoke City F.C. players
East Fife F.C. players
Plymouth Argyle F.C. players
Leeds City F.C. players
Brentford F.C. players
Southend United F.C. players
English Football League players
Southern Football League players
Western Football League players
1940 deaths
Scottish Football League players
Footballers from Fife